The 1969 BC Lions finished in third place in the Western Conference with a 5–11 record and made the playoffs due to a late season 4 game winning streak.

After taking the club to a 1–9 record, head coach Jim Champion was relieved of his duties, and on September 24, assistant coach Jackie Parker was promoted to head coach. Parker led the club to a 4–2 finish and an unlikely playoff berth. They appeared in the Western Semi-Final, losing to the Calgary Stampeders 35–21.

The offense continued to struggle and managed to score only 22 touchdowns. Jake Scott, MVP of Super Bowl VII, played as a wide receiver. Bruising fullback Jim Evenson had another 1200+ yard season, but again fell second in the rushing race to Saskatchewan's George Reed.

Offseason

CFL Draft

Preseason

Regular season

Season standings

Season schedule

Offensive leaders

Awards and records

1969 CFL All-Stars
None

References

BC Lions seasons
1969 Canadian Football League season by team
1969 in British Columbia